55th Paratroopers Brigade, also known as "Tip of The Spear Brigade" (Utzbat Hod Ha-Hanit), is a reserve-service infantry Brigade in the Israeli Defense Forces.

History

The 55th Paratrooopers Brigade is subordinate to the 98th Paratroopers Division. 

The brigade is a paratrooper unit within the Israel Defense Forces (IDF) which over the years has taken part in a number of the IDF operations, including the Battle of Ammunition Hill during the Six-Day War, Operation Abirey-Halev during the Yom Kippur War, the 1982 Lebanon War and the 2006 Lebanon War. 

The 55th is famous specifically for being the first Israeli brigade into the Old City of Jerusalem in 1967 and the first to cross the Suez Canal in 1973.

References

Airborne units and formations
Brigades of Israel
Central Command (Israel)
Infantry of Israel